HMS Ocelot (S17) is an  diesel-electric submarine which was operated by the Royal Navy.

Design and construction

The Oberon class was a direct follow-on of the Porpoise-class, with the same dimensions and external design, but updates to equipment and internal fittings, and a higher grade of steel used for fabrication of the pressure hull.

Displacement was 1,610 tons standard, 2,030 tons full load when surfaced, and 2,410 tons full load when submerged. Propulsion machinery consisted of two Admiralty Standard Range 16 VMS diesel generators, and two  electric motors, each driving a  three-bladed propeller at up to 400 rpm. Eight  torpedo tubes were fitted (six facing forward, two aft), with a total payload of 24 torpedoes. The boats were fitted with Type 186 and Type 187 sonars, and an I-band surface search radar. The standard complement was 68: 6 officers and 62 sailors.

Ocelot was laid down by Chatham Dockyard on 17 November 1960, and launched on 5 May 1962. The boat was commissioned into the Royal Navy on 31 January 1964. Ocelot was the last submarine built for the Royal Navy at Chatham Dockyard, although three more Oberons; Ojibwa, Onondaga and Okanagan—were built for the Royal Canadian Navy.

Operational history
After commissioning, Ocelot was assigned to the 3rd Submarine Squadron, based at HMNB Clyde, in Faslane, serving there for three years.

During the 1960s, Ocelot took part in clandestine missions. Ocelot attended the 1977 Silver Jubilee Fleet Review off Spithead when she was part of the Submarine Flotilla.

Decommissioning and fate
HMS Ocelot was paid off in August 1991 as the conventional submarine fleet of the RN began to decline, making way for the nuclear fleet. She was sold in 1992 and preserved as a fully tourable museum in Chatham Historic Dockyard.

In November 2013 the interior of HMS Ocelot was added to Google Street View by Google Business Photos Agency, CInsideMedia Ltd.

References

Publications

Gallery

External links 

 
 Google Streetview

 

Oberon-class submarines of the Royal Navy
Ships built in Chatham
1962 ships
Cold War submarines of the United Kingdom
Museum ships in the United Kingdom
Ships and vessels on the National Register of Historic Vessels